This is a list of species in the genus Smicronyx.

Smicronyx species

 Smicronyx abnormis Dietz, 1894
 Smicronyx albidosquamosus Klima, 1934
 Smicronyx albonotatus Anderson, 1962
 Smicronyx amoenus (Say, 1831)
 Smicronyx apionides Casey, 1892
 Smicronyx atratus Dietz, 1894
 Smicronyx californicus Dietz, 1894
 Smicronyx centralis (Dietz, 1894)
 Smicronyx cinereus (Motschulsky, 1845)
 Smicronyx commixtus Dietz, 1894
 Smicronyx compar (Dietz, 1894)
 Smicronyx congestus Casey, 1892
 Smicronyx constrictus (Say, 1824)
 Smicronyx convexus Anderson, 1962
 Smicronyx corniculatus (Fahraeus, 1843)
 Smicronyx corpulentus LeConte, 1876
 Smicronyx cuscutiflorae Pierce, 1939
 Smicronyx defricans Casey, 1892
 Smicronyx discoideus (LeConte, 1876)
 Smicronyx fiducialis Casey, 1892
 Smicronyx flavicans LeConte, 1876
 Smicronyx floridanus (Dietz, 1894)
 Smicronyx fraterculus Dietz, 1894
 Smicronyx fulvus LeConte, 1876  (red sunflower seed weevil)
 Smicronyx griseus LeConte, 1876
 Smicronyx halophilus Blatchley, 1920
 Smicronyx humilis (Dietz, 1894)
 Smicronyx imbricatus Casey, 1892
 Smicronyx immaculatus Anderson, 1962
 Smicronyx incertus (Dietz, 1894)
 Smicronyx instabilis Casey, 1892
 Smicronyx interruptus Blatchley, 1916
 Smicronyx intricatus Casey, 1892
 Smicronyx languidulus Dietz, 1894
 Smicronyx lepidus Dietz, 1894
 Smicronyx lineolatus Casey, 1892
 Smicronyx lutulentus Dietz, 1894
 Smicronyx madaranus  Kono, 1930 
 Smicronyx mucidus Dietz, 1894
 Smicronyx obscurus Anderson, 1962
 Smicronyx obtectus LeConte, 1876
 Smicronyx ovipennis LeConte, 1876
 Smicronyx pacificus Anderson, 1962
 Smicronyx pallidus Anderson, 1962
 Smicronyx perfidus Dietz, 1894
 Smicronyx perpusillus Casey, 1892
 Smicronyx pinguis Blatchley, 1916
 Smicronyx pleuralis Casey, 1892
 Smicronyx porrectus (Boheman, 1843)
 Smicronyx posticus Dietz, 1894
 Smicronyx profusus Casey, 1892
 Smicronyx pusillus Dietz, 1894
 Smicronyx pusio LeConte, 1876
 Smicronyx quadrifer Casey, 1892  (white dodder weevil)
 Smicronyx rectirostris Blatchley, 1922
 Smicronyx resplendens Dietz, 1894
 Smicronyx rhodopus Dietz, 1894
 Smicronyx scapalis (LeConte, 1876)
 Smicronyx sculpticollis Casey, 1892  (dodder gall weevil)
 Smicronyx seriatus LeConte, 1876
 Smicronyx silaceus Casey, 1892
 Smicronyx sordidus LeConte, 1876  (gray sunflower seed weevil)
 Smicronyx sparsus Casey, 1892
 Smicronyx spretus Dietz, 1894
 Smicronyx squalidus Casey, 1892
 Smicronyx tardus Dietz, 1894
 Smicronyx tesselatus Dietz, 1894
 Smicronyx triangularis (Dietz, 1894)
 Smicronyx tychoides LeConte, 1876
 Smicronyx utilis Buchanan, 1941
 Smicronyx vestitus LeConte, 1876

References

Smicronyx
Smicronyx